Embassy of Sweden in Copenhagen is the diplomatic mission of Sweden to the Kingdom of Denmark. It is located at Amaliegade 5A, 1256 Copenhagen K.

The residence
The ambassador's residence is located on Sankt Annæ Plads, on the southern boundary of Frederiksstaden. The building was originally built as a new home for Johan Jegind, a timber tradesman. Its architect was Nicolai Eigtved who also designed the masterplan for the new neighbourhood and many of its buildings.

The banker and later finance minister Johan Sigismund von Mösting lived in the building from 1814 until 1818. Count Carl von Moltke  lived there from 1845.

In 1852, Ph. Randrup, its owner at that time, extended it with an extra floor. He also expanded it with a new building along Sankt Annæ Plads which was completed in 1855.

The embassy
The embassy was located in the same building as the residence from 1921 to 2018. In September 2018 the embassy and the consular office moved to Amaliegade 5A.

Heads of Mission

See also
 Denmark–Sweden relations

References

External links

Official website

Sweden
Copenhagen